Deck Airport  is a privately owned, public-use airport  southwest of Myerstown, in Lebanon County, Pennsylvania. The airport was opened in March 1990.

References

External links 

 http://www.airnav.com/airport/08N
 http://www.deckairport.com/

Airports in Lebanon County, Pennsylvania
Airports established in 1990
1990 establishments in Pennsylvania